= Pulmonary disease, chronic obstructive, severe early-onset =

Genetic element in the species Homo sapiens

COPD

Identifiers
- Aliases: Pulmonary diseasechronic obstructivesevere early-onset
- External IDs: GeneCards: ; OMA:- orthologs
Orthologs
| Species | Human | Mouse |
| Entrez | 260431 | n/a |
| Ensembl | n/a | n/a |
| UniProt | n a | n/a |
| RefSeq (mRNA) | n/a | n/a |
| RefSeq (protein) | n/a | n/a |
| Location (UCSC) | n/a | n/a |
| PubMed search | | n/a |
- Wikidata
| View/Edit Human |

Pulmonary disease, chronic obstructive, severe early-onset is a protein that in humans is encoded by the COPD gene.
